Sabah Koj is an Australian fashion model of South Sudanese heritage. Koj was the first African model to open a fashion show in Australia.

Early life
As Sudanese refugees, her family emigrated to Egypt when she was 4 years old. They eventually settled in Melbourne, Australia in 2005. She speaks Arabic, English, and Dinka.

Career
She has modeled for Armani, Jacquemus, Burberry, Roland Mouret, Alexa Chung, Kate Spade, Emilio Pucci, Christian Siriano, Oscar de la Renta, Mugler, John Galliano, Balmain, Marc Jacobs, Roksanda Ilinčić, and Marni among others.

Koj had her debut appearance in the Victoria's Secret Fashion Show in 2018. In addition to Victoria’s Secret she has expressed Gucci and Prada as her modelling goals.

Models.com selected her as a ″Top Newcomer” in 2018.

References

Australian female models
Living people
1998 births
Australian people of South Sudanese descent
Australian models of South Sudanese descent